Judicial immunity is a form of sovereign immunity, which protects judges and others employed by the judiciary from liability resulting from their judicial actions.

Though judges have immunity from lawsuit, in constitutional democracies judicial misconduct or bad personal behaviour is not completely protected. Depending on the jurisdiction, they may be criminally charged for courtroom behavior unrelated to the decision-making process (for example, by shooting someone and committing a murder unrelated to capital punishment by the state), bad decisions may be reversed by an appeals court, and judges may be removed by other judges on the same or higher court (in the United States, a judicial council), by a recall election, by the next regular election, or following impeachment by a legislature.

History
Historically, judicial immunity was associated with the English common law idea that "the King can do no wrong" in the eyes of the courts, because the courts are created by the sovereign (sovereign immunity). Judges, the King's delegates for dispensing justice, accordingly "ought not to be drawn into question for any supposed corruption [for this tends] to the slander of the justice of the King". An example of applying judicial immunity: a judge is not liable for a slander or libel suit for statements made about someone during a trial, no matter how corrupt that act was.

United Kingdom 
In the United Kingdom, tribunals are considered judicial in nature and so judicial immunity applies to them at common law. This was accepted by the Employment Appeal Tribunal and subsequently the Court of Appeal of England and Wales in respect of police misconduct hearings constituted under the Police (Discipline) Regulations 1985 (since superseded by the Police (Conduct) Regulations 2008) in Heath v Commissioner of Police for the Metropolis [2004] EWCA Civ 943. However, in P v Commissioner of Police of the Metropolis [2017] UKSC 65, in which a police officer (an officer of the Crown, but under the Equality Act 2010 treated as an employee in employment discrimination cases) sought review of her dismissal as constituting disability discrimination due to post-traumatic stress disorder, the Supreme Court ruled that the Employment Equality Framework Directive (implemented by the 2010 Act) provided directly applicable rights of access to justice in cases of employment discrimination, which, given the supremacy of EU law, overrode the common law rule of judicial immunity.

United States
In the United States, judicial immunity is among a handful of forms of absolute immunity, along with prosecutorial immunity, legislative immunity, and witness immunity. The U.S. Supreme Court has characterized judicial immunity as providing "the maximum ability [of judges] to deal fearlessly and impartially with the public". The justification is as follows: because of the likelihood of innocent individuals being convicted in a court of law under false claims, the "burden" of being subjected to a court of law (a trial) would "dampen" the judges "enthusiasm" or "passion". Opponents of judicial immunity argue that this doctrine is not adequately justified. For example, judges could be shielded from any personal capacity liability, and still be subject to official capacity liability so that they may be held accountable for their injurious acts – thus "balancing" the "evil" to better protect the fundamental rights of victims.
 
Judicial immunity does not protect judges from suits stemming from administrative decisions made while off the bench, like hiring and firing decisions. But immunity generally does extend to all judicial decisions in which the judge has proper jurisdiction, even if a decision is made with "corrupt or malicious intent". In 1997 West Virginia judge Troisi became so irritated with a rude defendant, he stepped down from the bench, took off his robe, and bit the defendant on the nose.  He pleaded no contest to state charges but was acquitted of federal charges of violating the defendant's civil rights. He spent five days in jail and was put on probation.

Because the immunity is attached to the judicial nature of the acts, not the official title of the officeholder, judicial immunity also applies to administrative hearings, although in some situations, only qualified immunity applies. In determining whether absolute or qualified immunity should be provided, the U.S. Supreme Court has identified the following factors, according to the Shriver Center's Federal Practice Manual for Legal Aid Attorneys:

The following cases are relevant to this issue:

Origins
When the United States Constitution came into being in 1789, all federal employees had qualified immunity.  This immunity protected them from being sued while in the performance of their duties unless they broke laws or used gross negligence.  For the Judiciary, that all changed in 1872 with the lawsuit Bradley vs Fisher 80 U.S. 335, 351.  It is worthwhile noting that Supreme Court Chief Justice Salmon Chase, an inexperienced jurist (his previous position was in Treasury, where he distributed the first dollar bills with his picture on the front of each bill), had just replaced long term justice Roger Taney. "Bradley vs Fisher" was a court case filed by a trial judge against a lawyer who insulted him in the courtroom.  It resulted in the lawyer being permanently barred from practicing in federal court.  The Supreme Court took the opportunity to update the Rules of the Court to grant itself sovereign immunity. The Court said it was a minor issue.  However, Sovereign Immunity (think King George) is the reason the colonists fought the Revolutionary War, and a change of this magnitude should require a change to constitutional law (specifically, Article II of the Constitution concerning the establishment of the Judiciary).  Instead, the Judiciary placed itself above the law.  There is further proof of this in 28 U.S. §2072, where Congress allows Rules of the Court to supersede federal law.  In the hierarchy of law, (The World Court, national law and state law) Rules are made to guide the departments of state government. They exist to effectuate the spirit and intent of the law, and if they disagree with law, they must be dropped.  Here is that law:

Rules of the Court are updated annually by a committee of judges, with oversight provided by Congress. The above law can be found at the beginning of the Federal Rules of Civil Procedure, a copy of which is found here (pg. 7 of 137): Link

Stump v. Sparkman (1978) 

One of the leading decisions on judicial immunity is Stump v. Sparkman.  In 1971, Judge Harold D. Stump granted a mother's petition to have a tubal ligation performed on her 15-year-old daughter, whom the mother alleged was "somewhat retarded". The daughter was told that the surgery was to remove her appendix. In 1975 the daughter, going by her then-married name of Linda Sparkman, learned that she had been sterilized.  She sued the judge.  The U.S. Supreme Court ruled that the judge could not be sued, because the decision was made in the course of his duties.  In that regard, it was irrelevant that the judge's decision may have been contrary to law and morally reprehensible.

Harris v. Harvey (1979) 

Judges usually, but not always, receive immunity from being sued. One exception where a judge was sued and lost is Harris v. Harvey (1979). Sylvester Harris, an African-American police lieutenant in Racine, Wisconsin, was attacked in a variety of ways by Judge Richard G. Harvey. Harris sued Harvey because of (a) comments Harvey made to the news media, (b) threatening letters Harvey wrote to city and county officials who attempted to defend Harris, and (c) parties Harvey held for ranking state officials during which he attempted to get Harris removed from law enforcement. The jury concluded that Harvey was not eligible for judicial immunity for these actions, as such acts which were not part of the judge's normal duties (i.e. were "outside his jurisdiction"). The jury awarded Harris $260,000 damages. Another judge later added $7,500 legal fees. The United States Court of Appeals for the Seventh Circuit concurred with the jury's decision. Judge Harvey petitioned the Seventh Circuit court for an en banc rehearing, which was denied. His petition to the Supreme Court was also denied. Harris v. Harvey is the first case in the United States where a sitting court judge has been sued and lost in a civil action; it is a binding precedent in the Seventh Circuit and is persuasive authority in the other circuits.

Supreme Court of Virginia v. Consumers Union (1980) 
In Supreme Court of Virginia v. Consumers Union (1980), the U.S. Supreme Court ruled that the Supreme Court of Virginia did not have immunity in federal court from being enjoined in its enforcement capacity where state law gave the court independent authority to initiate certain proceedings against attorneys. Consumers Union was hindered from compiling an attorney directory because many attorneys they contacted declined to provide requested information out of fear of violating attorney conduct regulations promulgated by the Supreme Court of Virginia. Consumers Union filed a lawsuit in federal court against the Supreme Court of Virginia and others, under 42 U.S.C. § 1983, seeking to have the regulation declared unconstitutional and to enjoin the defendants from enforcing it. The U.S. Supreme Court affirmed the Supreme Court of Virginia's legislative immunity:

Mireles v. Waco (1991) 
In the case of Mireles v. Waco (1991), when a defense lawyer failed to appear for a scheduled hearing, the judge not only issued a bench warrant for his arrest, but instructed the police sent to arrest him to "rough him up a little" to teach him not to skip court dates. Although this was entirely unprofessional and possibly criminal, the judge was held, by the Supreme Court, to have absolute immunity from a lawsuit arising from the resulting beating, because the misbehavior occurred entirely within his activities as a judge presiding over a court.

See also 

 Judicial misconduct
 Diminished responsibility
 Diminished capacity in United States law

References

Further reading

External links
 The Horrifying Extent of Absolute Judicial Immunity

Legal immunity